Cyrus Alger (11 November 1781, in West Bridgewater, Massachusetts – 4 February 1856, in Boston) was a United States arms manufacturer and inventor.

Biography
Early in life Alger became an iron founder, training in one of his father's three foundries in the Boston area, in Easton, Massachusetts.  In 1809, he worked with Thomas Handasyd Perkins, likely tied to Perkins's interest in the Monkton Iron Works in Vergennes, Vermont.  Initially Monkton aimed to provide iron to American consumers while the Embargo stymied foreign competition.  While the Embargo's end threatened business, the War of 1812 created a new market for Monkton.  The company supplied the American government with large numbers of cannon balls as well as iron to join the timbers in constructing frigates.

In 1817 Alger incorporated the South Boston Iron Company in Dorchester, Massachusetts.  Through his firm's success, the region became a hub for iron manufacturing.

Alger was one of the best practical metallurgists of his time.  His numerous patents of improved processes show a continued advance in the art. The first gun ever rifled in America was made at his works in 1834, and the first perfect bronze cannon was made at his foundry for the U. S. ordnance department, The mortar “Columbiad,” the largest gun of cast iron that had then been made in the United States, was cast under his personal supervision.

Alger also devised numerous improvements in the construction of time fuses for bomb shells and grenades. In 1811 he patented a method of making cast-iron chilled rolls, and in 1822 first designed cylinder stoves. Alger served as a member of the city council during the first year of its existence, and was elected alderman in 1824 and 1827.

He is buried in Union Cemetery in South Boston.

See also
 Field artillery in the American Civil War
 Siege artillery in the American Civil War

Notes

References

External links

Extremely Rare Bronze Model 1835  12 Pound Mountain Howitzer
Blissfield Monument
Alger's Gun Works, And this is good old Boston

1781 births
1856 deaths
19th-century American inventors
American metallurgists
People from West Bridgewater, Massachusetts
Burials at Mount Auburn Cemetery
Businesspeople from Boston
19th-century American businesspeople
American Civil War artillery
Inventors from Massachusetts